Amelia Summerville (born Amelia Shaw, 15 October 1862 – 21 January 1934) was an Irish-born American stage and silent film actress.

Biography
Summerville was born in County Kildare, Ireland and migrated to Toronto, Ontario, Canada as a child. She first appeared on stage at the age of 7 in an operetta in Toronto.

In 1884, Summerville appeared in her first leading role in the play Adonis. She originated the role of Rosetta, the Mountain Maid.

Summerville appeared in fourteen Broadway plays from 1885 to 1925. She also performed in silent films during the 1910s and 1920s.

She authored Why be Fat?: Rules for Weight-reduction and the Preservation of Youth and Health (1916). She was a fan of corned beef hash and stale bread.

In 1920 she was named chairman of the New York Women's State Democratic Committee.

She fell on ice on January 3, 1934, and died on January 21 of her injuries.

Partial filmography
Mrs. Dane's Defense (1918)
How Could You, Caroline? (1918)
Getting Mary Married (1919)
The Probation Wife (1919)
My Little Sister (1919)
The Witness for the Defense (1919)
April Folly (1920)
Romance (1920)
Romola (1924)
The Great Deception (1926)

Publications

Why Be Fat?: Rules for Weight-Reduction and the Preservation, of Youth and Health (1916)
The Speaking Voice (1927)

References 
Notes

Bibliography

External links 

 
 
 

1862 births
1934 deaths
19th-century American actresses
American stage actresses
Actresses from County Kildare
Canadian expatriate actresses in the United States
Diet food advocates
Irish emigrants to Canada (before 1923)
Singers from New York City